Diamond Days may refer to:

Music

Albums 

 Diamond Days (The Outfield album), released in 1990
 Diamond Days (Out of the Grey album), released in 1994
 Diamond Days (Eric Bibb album), released in 2007
 Collection Album Vol.1 Diamond Days, by Lia (singer) 2007
 Diamond Days (Bento album), Ben Gillies solo album 2012

Songs 
 "Diamond Days", single by Kids in Glass Houses from In Gold Blood
 "Diamond Days", single by Mary Black, written by Jimmy MacCarthy 1985
 "Diamond Days" a song written by Chris Murphy and performed on season 4 of Australian Idol 
 "Diamond Days", single by Cruel Youth from +30mg

Other 
 Diamond Day Records, the label of The Steepwater Band
 Diamond Days, a five-week special event concluding Steven Universes fifth and final season